The 2016 Tokyo Marathon was the tenth edition of the annual marathon race in Tokyo, Japan and was held on Sunday, 28 February. An IAAF Gold Label Road Race, it was the first World Marathon Majors event to be held that year.

Results

Men

Women

Wheelchair
The Elite Wheelchair race acted as a qualifier for the 2016 Summer Paralympics in Rio. A top three finish or a qualifying time of 1:28:30 (men) or 1:46:00 (women) gave competitors a berth for the Rio Games.

References

External links

Official website

Tokyo Marathon
Tokyo
2016 in Tokyo
Tokyo Marathon
February 2016 sports events in Japan